"Anji" (also spelled "Angi", "Angie" or "On gee") is an acoustic fingerstyle guitar piece composed and recorded by noted folk guitarist Davy Graham in 1961 and originally released as part of his EP debut 3/4 AD. The piece is one of the best-known acoustic blues-folk guitar pieces ever composed, with many notable artists covering it, such as Bert Jansch (included on his first, eponymous album in 1965, renamed as "Angie" - the album cover credits Graham), John Renbourn, Lillebjørn Nilsen, Paul Simon (on the Simon & Garfunkel album Sounds of Silence), and Harry Sacksioni (on his Optima Forma - Live album). The song is in the key of A minor (often used with a capo at the second fret) and is notable for its trademark descending bassline. However, the original recording by Davy Graham is in the key of C minor with a capo at the third fret.

Parts of the tune were sampled for the Chumbawamba track "Jacob's Ladder" from their album Readymades and the anti-war single "Jacob's Ladder (Not In My Name)". Paul Simon, in his version, quotes another song from the same Sounds of Silence album, "We've Got a Groovy Thing Goin'," and, further, another song from the same album, "Somewhere They Can't Find Me," opens with the guitar riff from "Anji".

References

British folk songs
1961 songs
1960s instrumentals
Simon & Garfunkel songs